Amata Airport is a sealed airstrip servicing the town of Amata in the APY Lands of northern South Australia.

Amata is one of three sealed and six unsealed airstrips in the APY Lands. It has lights to enable night operations. It was upgraded in 2016 with camel-proof fencing.

See also
List of airports in South Australia

References

Airports in South Australia
Anangu Pitjantjatjara Yankunytjatjara